Coal Lake may refer to:

Coal Lake (Alberta)
Coal Lake (Minnesota)